{{Speciesbox
|image = Euonymus pendulus 9332.jpg
|genus = Euonymus
|species = pendulus
|authority = Wall.
|synonyms = Euonymus lucidus D.Don
}}Euonymus pendulus''' is a species of Euonymus'' native to the Himalaya region, from Pakistan east to northern Assam.

It is an evergreen shrub or small tree, which grows to be 6–10 m tall with a dense, spreading crown and corky grey bark. The leaves are glossy green and often bronze-red when newly opened. They are lanceolate to narrow ovate, 5–12 cm long and 2–3 cm broad, with a serrated margin. The flowers are small, with four white petals approximately 4 mm long. The fruit produced by the plant are three or four-lobed berry-like capsules which are 15 mm broad. Each contains three or four seeds surrounded by fleshy orange-red arils.

References

pendulus